"Gotham City" is a song by American R&B singer R. Kelly based on the fictional city of the same name. It was featured on the soundtrack to the film Batman & Robin, and it reached number nine on both the US Billboard Hot 100 and Hot R&B/Hip-Hop Songs charts. In Europe, the song peaked within the top 10 in Germany, Hungary, the Netherlands, Sweden, Switzerland and the UK, and within the top 20 in Iceland, Ireland and Scotland. The music video for the song was directed by Hype Williams. A remix version for the song was released featuring rapper Strings with a video also directed by Williams.

Critical reception
Larry Flick from Billboard complimented the singer for "his spiritual side, infusing this atmospheric acoustic soul ballad with uplifting lyrics and a choral climax". He noted that "the whole tone and musical texture of this single are markedly different from anything that Kelly has previously recorded. It's a refreshing change that leaves you anticipating the direction he will take on his next album". Pan-European magazine Music & Media declared it "a very well-crafted ballad". 

Programmer Vranz van Maaren at the Netherlands leading station, AC outlet Sky 100.7 FM commented: "In general I am not that R&B-minded but when I first saw the clip I was just blown away and when I contacted the record company (Zomba) they handed me a copy as soon as possible, because they were afraid that I'd change my mind if I found out it was R. Kelly". He also added: "The song is far less R&B than many of his previous efforts, and shows that he's able to broaden his potential audience a great deal without alienating his traditional fan base". Alan Jones from Music Week described it as "a pretty, semi-acoustic ballad not a million miles away from some of the stuff Babyface does. It has a rousing chorus on which Kelly is aided and abetted by the soulful interjections of the Chi-Towne Gospel Machine and Tyrone's Kids. Another smash."

Music video
A music video was produced to promote the single, directed by American director Hype Williams. It features Kelly driving his motorcycle around New York City. He also passes Times Square. Kelly also drives the Batmobile. Singer Sparkle is featured in video as a dancer. Williams also directed the music video for the remix of the song.

Track listings
 "Gotham City"
 "Gotham City" (LP version)
 "Thank God It's Friday"
 "Down Low (Nobody Has to Know)" (radio version)
 "Gotham City" (acapella and music)

 "Gotham City" remix
 "Gotham City" (LP version)
 "Gotham City" (remix)
 "Gotham City" (acapella and music)
 "Gotham City" (instrumental)
 "Gotham City" (remix instrumental)

Charts and certifications

Weekly charts

Year-end charts

Certifications

References

1997 singles
Batman music
Batman (1989 film series)
Music videos directed by Hype Williams
R. Kelly songs
Pop ballads
Contemporary R&B ballads
Songs written by R. Kelly
Song recordings produced by R. Kelly
1997 songs
Jive Records singles
1990s ballads